
قلب, transliterated Qalb, Qlb and Alb, is a functional programming language allowing a programmer to write programs completely in Arabic. Its name means heart and is a recursive acronym in Arabic meaning Qlb: a programming language. It was developed in 2012 by Ramsey Nasser, a computer scientist at the Eyebeam Art + Technology Center in New York City, as both an artistic endeavor and as a response to the Anglophone bias in the vast majority of programming languages, which express their fundamental concepts using English words.

The syntax is like that of Lisp or Scheme, consisting of parenthesized lists. All keywords are appropriate Arabic terms, and program text is laid out right-to-left, like all Arabic text. Specifically, the Arabic used is Lebanese Arabic, as is evident by the use of  instead of the Modern Standard Arabic . The language provides a minimal set of primitives for defining functions, conditionals, looping, list manipulation, and basic arithmetic expressions. It is Turing-complete, and the Fibonacci sequence and Conway's Game of Life have been implemented.

Because all program text is written in Arabic, and the connecting strokes between characters in the Arabic script can be extended to any length, it is possible to align the source code in artistic patterns, in the tradition of Arabic calligraphy.

A JavaScript-based interpreter is currently hosted on herokuapp and the project can be forked on GitHub.

Hello world 

 (قول "مرحبا يا عالم")

 (قول "Hello, world‎")

References

Further reading

External links
 Artist's statement
 قلب REPL

Functional languages
Non-English-based programming languages
Lisp programming language family